The Pianist is a studio album by the American pianist, composer and bandleader Duke Ellington, compiled from sessions in 1966 and 1970, and released on the Fantasy Records label in 1974. Tracks one through seven were recorded at RCA Studio A in New York, New York on July 18, 1966. Tracks eight through ten were recorded in Las Vegas, Nevada on January 7, 1970.

Reception

The AllMusic review by Scott Yanow stated: "Duke Ellington had so many talents (composer, arranger, bandleader, personality) that his skills as a pianist could easily be overlooked. Fortunately he did record a fair amount of trio albums through the years so there is plenty of evidence as to his unique style which was both modern and traditional at the same time".

Track listing

Personnel
Duke Ellington – piano
John Lamb (tracks 1-7), Paul Kondziela (tracks 8-10), Victor Gaskin (tracks 8-10) - bass
Sam Woodyard (tracks 1-7), Rufus Jones (tracks 8-10) - drums

References

Fantasy Records albums
Duke Ellington albums
1974 albums